(often hyphenated or as one word, and with variant spellings , piripiri or ) is a cultivar of Capsicum frutescens  from the malagueta pepper. It was originally produced by Portuguese explorers in Portugal's former Southern African territories, particularly Mozambique and its border regions with South Africa, and then spread to other Portuguese domains.

Etymology
Pilipili in Swahili means "pepper". The  spelling is common in English, for example in reference to African-style chili sauce, but in Portuguese it is nearly always spelled piri-piri.

The Oxford Dictionary of English records  as a foreign word meaning "a very hot sauce made with red ", and gives its ultimate origin as the word for "pepper" (presumably in the native-African sense) in the Ronga language of southern Mozambique, where Portuguese explorers developed the homonymous cultivar from malagueta pepper.

Plant characteristics

Immature pod colour is green, mature colour is bright red or purple. Some Bird's eye chili varieties measure up to 175,000 Scoville heat units.

Cultivation
Like all chili peppers,  is descended from plants from the Americas, but it has grown in the wild in Africa for centuries and is now cultivated commercially in Zambia, Uganda, Malawi, Zimbabwe, and Rwanda. It grows mainly in Malawi, Zambia, South Africa, Ghana, Nigeria, Zimbabwe, Mozambique and Portugal. It is cultivated for both commercial food processing and the pharmaceutical industry.

sauce

Originally produced by Portuguese in Southern Africa (there is still a debate whether Portuguese initially produced it in Angola or Mozambique), the sauce is made from  chilis (used as a seasoning or marinade). Beyond Portugal and the Southern African region (Angola, Namibia, Mozambique and South Africa) where it was born, the sauce is particularly well known in the United Kingdom due to the success of the South African restaurant chain Nando's. 

Recipes vary from region to region, and sometimes within the same region depending on intended use (example, cooking vs. seasoning at the table) but the key ingredients are chili and garlic, with an oily or acidic base.

Other common ingredients are salt, spirits (namely whisky), citrus peel, onion, pepper, bay leaves, paprika, pimiento, basil, oregano and tarragon.

See also

 Berbere
 List of Capsicum cultivars

References

External links
 

Portuguese cuisine
Brazilian cuisine
Spices
Chili peppers
Reduplicants
Capsicum cultivars
Hot sauces
Mozambican cuisine
Angolan cuisine
Namibian cuisine
South African cuisine